Wonder of the Seas is the flagship of Royal Caribbean International. She was completed in 2022 in the Chantiers de l'Atlantique shipyard in Saint-Nazaire, France, the fifth in Royal Caribbean's  of cruise ships. At , she is the largest cruise ship in the world by gross tonnage, surpassing her sister ship , also owned by Royal Caribbean International.

Description and design
Wonder of the Seas measures  in length and has a gross tonnage of 236,857 across 18 decks. This ship accommodates 5,734 passengers at double occupancy, & up to a maximum capacity of 6,988 passengers, as well as a 2,300 crew. There are 16 decks for guest use, 20 restaurants, 4 pools and 2,867 cabins.

Wonder of the Seas has eight different "neighborhoods", including an all new suite neighborhood.

As with all Oasis-class ships, one of the special features on board is the Central Park, with more than 10,000 plants and flowers.

Wonder of the Seas is powered by six marine-diesel sets: two 16-cylinder Wärtsilä 16V46D common rail engines and four 12-cylinder Wärtsilä 12V46D engines.

For propulsion, Wonder of the Seas uses three 20,000 kilowatt azipod main engines, which are electric thrusters. These engines are mounted under the stern of the ship and they each drive 20 foot wide rotatable propellers.  In addition to the three electric thrusters, there are four bow thrusters used for docking, each with 5,500 kilowatts of power or 7,380 horsepower.

Construction and career

On 25 May 2016, Royal Caribbean Group signed a memorandum of understanding with STX France (now Chantiers de l'Atlantique) for a fifth Oasis-class ship for delivery in the spring of 2021. The first steel for the new ship was cut at the Saint-Nazaire shipyard in April 2019, and the vessel's keel was laid on 9 May 2019.

In August 2020, as a result of the COVID-19 pandemic, Royal Caribbean announced that delivery of the ship would be delayed until 2022.

In April 2021 Royal Caribbean opened bookings aboard Wonder of the Seas for an inaugural 2022 season sailing in Asia from ports in Shanghai and Hong Kong. However, in September of that year, Royal Caribbean announced that the ship would instead debut at Port Everglades, sailing Caribbean cruises, before moving to the Mediterranean in the summer, sailing out of Barcelona and Rome. In November 2021 the ship's livery was modified to resemble that of Odyssey of the Seas, with her name moved rearward and repainted in larger print. The following month, Royal Caribbean announced that the ship would homeport at Port Canaveral in Florida starting in November 2022.

On 29 October 2021 Royal Caribbean accepted the ship for "technical delivery", and the following week she sailed under her own power from Saint-Nazaire to a Chantier Naval de Marseille drydock in Marseille-Fos Port for finishing work. On 27 January 2022 the ship was handed over to Royal Caribbean. She arrived in North America in February 2022, and commenced her maiden voyage on 4 March 2022 out of Port Everglades.

References

External links

 

2020 ships
Ships built in France
Ships of Royal Caribbean International